The Scout is a famous statue by Cyrus E. Dallin in Kansas City, Missouri. The Scout was conceived by Dallin in 1910, and exhibited at the 1915 Panama–Pacific International Exposition in San Francisco, where it won a gold medal. On its way back east, the statue was installed on a temporary basis in Penn Valley Park. The statue proved so popular that  in nickels and dimes was raised to purchase it through a campaign called "The Kids of Kansas City". The statue was dedicated in 1922 as a permanent memorial to local Indian tribes. It is located east of Southwest Trafficway in Penn Valley Park, which is south of downtown Kansas City. 

Several area features have been named after the iconic statue, such as Kansas City Scout, which is the Kansas City metropolitan area's electronic traffic alert system. The statue inspired the name of the National Hockey League's Kansas City Scouts and was featured on the team's logo.

A half-size replica was given by Kansas City to its sister-city, Seville, Spain in 1992.

References

Buildings and structures in Kansas City, Missouri
Outdoor sculptures in Missouri
Tourist attractions in Kansas City, Missouri
Equestrian statues in Missouri
Sculptures of Native Americans
1915 sculptures
Bronze sculptures in Missouri
Statues in Missouri
Works by Cyrus Edwin Dallin